Eric Milligan may refer to:
 Eric Milligan (politician)
 Eric Milligan (rugby union)

See also
 Eric Millegan, American actor